The administrative units of Pakistan comprise four provinces, one federal territory, and two disputed territories: the provinces of Punjab, Sindh, Khyber Pakhtunkhwa, and Balochistan; the Islamabad Capital Territory; and the administrative territories of Azad Jammu and Kashmir and Gilgit–Baltistan. As part of the Kashmir conflict with neighbouring India, Pakistan has also claimed sovereignty over the Indian-controlled territories of Jammu and Kashmir and Ladakh since the First Kashmir War of 1947–1948, but has never exercised administrative authority over either region. All of Pakistan's provinces and territories are subdivided into divisions, which are further subdivided into districts, and then tehsils, which are again further subdivided into union councils.

History of Pakistan

Early history
Pakistan inherited the territory comprising its current provinces from the British Raj following the Partition of India on 14 August 1947. Two days after independence, the Muslim-majority Murshidabad district in Bengal was moved out of the Dominion of Pakistan and put within the Dominion of India due to a boundary adjustment by the Radcliffe Commission which was aimed at keeping the Hooghly River entirely within India. The western wing consisted of a merger of the North-West Frontier Province, West Punjab, Sind Province, Baluchistan CCP and 13 princely states. The eastern wing consisted of East Bengal.

In 1948, Karachi was separated from Sind Province to form the Federal Capital Territory. In 1950, the North-West Frontier Province absorbed the princely states of Amb and Phulra while West Punjab (designated 'West' to distinguish it from India's Punjab in the east) was renamed to simply Punjab. In 1952, the four princely states in the southwest formed the Baluchistan States Union.

In 1955, the One Unit policy was launched by then-Prime Minister Muhammad Ali Bogra, whereby all the provinces and princely states of the western wing were merged to form the provincial wing of West Pakistan, with Lahore serving as its provincial capital. Simultaneously, East Bengal was redesignated as East Pakistan, with Dacca serving as its provincial capital. The One Unit policy aimed to reduce expenditure and to eliminate provincial prejudices, but the military coup of 1958 brought difficulties when the first military President, Ayub Khan, abolished the office of the Chief Minister of West Pakistan in favour of Governor rule.

Gwadar formally became a part of Pakistan on 8 December 1958, ending 174 years of Omani rule. In 1960, the federal capital was moved from Karachi to Rawalpindi and in 1961, the Federal Capital Territory was also merged into West Pakistan. In 1966, the capital was again moved to the newly constructed city of Islamabad. In 1962, Dacca was made the legislative capital of the country due to East Pakistan's high population. Following the 1963 Sino–Pakistan Agreement, a part of the Gilgit Agency (controlled by Pakistan since the First Kashmir War) was formally relinquished by Pakistan to the People's Republic of China (the Trans-Karakoram Tract/Shaksgam Valley in northeastern Kashmir) with the provision that the settlement was subject to the final solution of the Kashmir dispute between India and Pakistan.

Since 1970
In 1970, the second military President, Yahya Khan, abolished the political structure of West Pakistan and established four new provinces: Sindh, Punjab, Balochistan and the North-West Frontier Province. In 1971, the Bengali-majority wing of East Pakistan seceded from the Pakistani union following the Bangladesh Liberation War, consequently forming the independent People's Republic of Bangladesh. In 1974, the remaining princely states of Hunza and Nagar were abolished and their territories merged into the Gilgit Agency, following which the Northern Areas were formed. In 1975, portions of the districts of Peshawar and Dera Ismail Khan were separated to form the Federally Administered Tribal Areas. In 1981, the region surrounding Islamabad was separated from Punjab province, and renamed to the Islamabad Capital Territory.

In August 2000, divisions were abolished as part of a plan to restructure local governments, followed by elections in 2001. Many of the functions previously handled at a provincial level had been transferred to individual districts and tehsils. In 2008, the government restored the former divisions and appointed commissioners.

In 2009, the Northern Areas were renamed to Gilgit-Baltistan, and retained its formal status as an autonomous territory. In 2010, the North-West Frontier Province was formally renamed to Khyber Pakhtunkhwa. In 2018, the National Assembly of Pakistan and Khyber Pakhtunkhwa Provincial Assembly passed the historic FATA Merger Bill with the Twenty-Fifth Constitutional Amendment. On 31 May 2018, the final step in the merger of the Federally Administered Tribal Areas with Khyber Pakhtunkhwa was completed, as then-President Mamnoon Hussain signed the 25th Constitutional Amendment Bill into law. The amendment's signing abolished the Federally Administered Tribal Areas as a separate political entity and merged them into the province of Khyber Pakhtunkhwa.

Tiers of governance

The diagram below outlines the six tiers of government:

Division 

The Provinces and administrative territories of Pakistan are subdivided into administrative "divisions", Divisional Commissioner is the administrative head of a division. Divisional Commissioner is appointed by the government of Pakistan from Pakistan Administrative Service

District 

The District Coordination Officer is the administrative head of the District Administration. They have wide-ranging responsibility for overseeing, improving and directing the approved plans of the District Government.

The Zila Nazim used to be the executive head of the District Administration until 2010 when the government gave their powers to the District Coordination Officers also. Their role is similar to district governor or prefect, with responsibility for implementing government strategy and developing initiatives arising out of it.

In order to decentralize administrative and financial authority to be accountable to Local Governments, for good governance, effective delivery of services, and transparent decision making through institutionalized participation of the people at grassroots level, elections to the local government institutions are held after every four years on none party basis by the Chief Election Commissioner of Pakistan.

Tehsil 

Among the three tiers of local government, tehsil government is the second tier. It is where the functions, responsibilities, and authorities of districts government are divided into smaller units, these units are known as "tehsils". The tehsils are used all over Pakistan except Sindh province where the word "taluka" is used instead, although the functions and authorities are the same. The head of the Tehsil government is "Tehsil Nazim" who is assisted by the tehsil Naib-Nazim. Every tehsil has a Tehsil Municipal Administration, consisting of a tehsil council, Tehsil Nazim, tehsil/taluka municipal officer (TMO), chief officer and other officials of the local council.

Union council 

Members of the union council including Union Administrator and Vice Union Administrator are elected through direct elections based on adult franchise and on the basis of joint electorate. However, for the election to the reserved seats for women in Zila Council proportionately divided among tehsils or towns shall be all members of the union councils in a tehsil or town. It is the responsibility of the Chief Election Commissioner to organize and conduct these elections.

Current administrative units

Proposed provinces 
 Bahawalpur Province
 South Punjab Province / Saraikistan Province
 South Balochistan / Brahuistan Province	
 Karachi Province / Jinnahpur Province / Muhajir Sooba
 Hazara Province	
 Qabailistan Province
 Gilgit-Baltistan Province / Balawaristan Province / Karakoram Province
 Review of the Divisions of Pakistan for New Provinces

See also

 Abbreviations of administrative units of Pakistan
 Cantonment (Pakistan), permanent military stations, which may include significant civilian populations
 Former administrative units of Pakistan
 Former princely states of Pakistan
 ISO 3166-2:PK
 List of administrative units of Pakistan by Human Development Index
 List of capitals in Pakistan
 List of cities in Pakistan by population
 List of Pakistani administrative units by gross state product
 List of Pakistani administrative divisions by highest elevation
 Local government in Pakistan
 Divisions of Pakistan
 Districts of Pakistan
 Tehsils of Pakistan
 Union councils of Pakistan

Notes

References

External links
 Government of Azad Jammu & Kashmir
 Government of Balochistan
 Government of Gilgit-Baltistan
 Government of Islamabad Capital Territory 
 Government of Khyber Pakhtunkhwa
 Government of Punjab
 Government of Sindh

Lists of subdivisions of Pakistan